The 2004 edition to the Fort Worth Bowl, the second edition, featured the Marshall Thundering Herd, and the Cincinnati Bearcats. It had a title sponsor of PlainsCapital Bank. The game was particularly notable because it featured an incoming school (Marshall) to and outgoing school (Cincinnati) from Conference USA.

Cincinnati scored first, when Antauwn Gibbons recovered a blocked punt, and rushed it in 9 yards for a touchdown, giving Cincinnati an early 7–0 lead. Kevin Lovell added a 23-yard field goal to give Cincinnati a 10–0 lead. Marshall got on the scoreboard following a 14-yard touchdown pass from quarterback Stan Hill to wide receiver Josh Davis making it 10–7. They later took the lead when cornerback Willie Smith intercepted a pass, and returned it 32 yards for a touchdown, putting Marshall on top 14–10.

The second quarter belonged to Cincinnati. Quarterback Gino Guidugli fired a 15-yard touchdown pass to wide receiver Brent Celek to put Cincinnati back on top 17–14. He later threw another touchdown pass to Earnest Jackson increasing Cincinnati's lead to 24–14. That score stood up at halftime. After a scoreless third quarter, Cincinnati scored two field goals and recorded a safety to make the final margin 32–14.

References

External links
USAToday.com recap of game

Fort Worth Bowl
Armed Forces Bowl
Cincinnati Bearcats football bowl games
Marshall Thundering Herd football bowl games
December 2004 sports events in the United States
2004 in sports in Texas